Vladimir Isakov may refer to:

 Vladimir Isakov (born 1970), Russian sport shooter
 Vladimir Isakov (politician) (born 1987), Russian politician
 Vladimir Isakov (footballer) (born 1979), Russian footballer